

 (literal English translation: "Aino's Place") is a museum in Järvenpää, Finland, that originally was the home of the Finnish composer Jean Sibelius, his wife Aino (née Järnefelt), and their six daughters.

The Ministry of Education and the Sibelius Society of Finland have jointly operated Ainola since 1974.

Overview 
The only requests Sibelius had for Sonck were to include both a lakefront view and a green fireplace in the dining room. Water pipes were never installed until after Sibelius's death because he did not want the distraction while he was there composing.

Its distance from the hustle and bustle of the nation's capital gave the composer the peace that he needed for his creative endeavours. His biographer Erik W. Tawaststjerna writes that "when Sibelius first left Helsinki, Järvenpää was to a large extent untouched countryside. Foals and sheep almost nosed their way into the house, and from time to time an elk majestically bestrode the grounds." There were also other artistic families living in the neighborhood who provided a lively social circle for the Sibelius family.

Daily life in Ainola was documented by Sibelius's private secretary Santeri Levas in the 1945 photographic book Jean Sibelius and His Home.

Buildings around Ainola include the sauna and the family's personal workshop. Sibelius died at Ainola on September 20, 1957. His wife Aino lived in Ainola for the next twelve years until she died on June 8, 1969. They both are buried in the Ainola garden surrounded by apple trees.

Museum
In 1972, Jean Sibelius's daughters Eva Paloheimo, Katarina Ilves, Margareta Jalas, and Heidi Blomstedt sold Ainola to the Finnish government. The Ministry of Education and the Sibelius Society of Finland opened it as a museum in June 1974. It is currently open from May to September. Among the personal effects remaining there are a Steinway grand piano, which was a gift to Sibelius on his fiftieth birthday in 1915, and paintings by Aino's brother Eero Järnefelt.

See also 
 List of music museums

References

Bibliography

External links

Ainola website
Ainola – the home of Jean Sibelius. Virtual Finland, 2008. Archived at Wayback Machine  

Houses in Finland
Historic house museums in Finland
Järvenpää
Jean Sibelius
Music museums
Biographical museums in Finland
Museums established in 1974
1974 establishments in Finland
Lars Sonck buildings
National Romantic architecture in Finland
Art Nouveau houses
Houses completed in 1904
Music organisations based in Finland